The national anthem of Tibet, commonly referred to as "Gyallu", is a Tibetan patriotic song which serves as the de facto anthem of the Central Tibetan Administration.

It is unclear exactly whether it was first used before the Annexation of Tibet by the People's Republic of China in 1951, or after the 14th Dalai Lama went into exile in India in 1960. The earliest report of a state anthem (presumably "Gyallu") is between 1949 and 1950 when Tibet was under invasion. It was introduced under reforms set in place to strengthen patriotism among the Tibetan people. Another report states that the anthem was presented to the 14th Dalai Lama in 1960 in exile.

Like "Qurtulush Yolida", performance of this anthem is strictly prohibited by the People's Republic of China, particularly in the Tibet Autonomous Region.

Tibet's first national anthem was, according to Tashi Tsering, written by a Tibetan scholar during the epoch of the 7th Dalai Lama and under the reign of the Pholanas in between 1745 and 1746.

Lyrics
Written by Trijang Rinpoche around 1950, a tutor of the 14th Dalai Lama, the lyrics focus on the radiance of the Gautama Buddha.

The melody is said to be based on a very old piece of Tibetan sacred music, and some of its elements are also found in other Tibetan songs such as that of Mimang Langlu, a song of the 1959 Tibetan uprising. The lyrics are by the Dalai Lama's tutor, Trijang Rinpoche. It has been used by Tibetans in exile ever since the introduction of the state anthem although it is banned in Tibet.

Current lyrics

Original version
The first Tibetan national anthem was created in the 18th century. According to eminent Tibetan scholar Tashi Tsering, it was composed by Pholanas around 1745, at the time of the 7th Dalai Lama. Sir Charles Bell described it as Tibet's "national hymn".

Notes

References

External links
 The Central Tibetan Administration has a page about "Gyallu" that includes audio instrumental and vocal versions.
 Tibetan National Anthem by Kelsang Chuki Tenthong (YouTube)

Tibetan culture
Tibet
Tibetan Buddhist art and culture
National symbols of Tibet
Historical national anthems
Anthems of non-sovereign states